
Year 510 (DX) was a common year starting on Friday (link will display the full calendar) of the Julian calendar. In the Roman Empire, it was known as the Year of the Consulship of Severinus without colleague (or, less frequently, year 1263 Ab urbe condita). The denomination 510 for this year has been used since the early medieval period, when the Anno Domini calendar era became the prevalent method in Europe for naming years.

Events 
 By place 

 Britannia 
 Battle of Llongborth (possibly Langport or Portsmouth): King Budic II of Brittany seeks refuge at the court of Aergol Lawhir, in Dyfed (Wales) after the battle.

 Europe 
 King Theodoric the Great raises the Frankish siege at Arles; the city is heroically defended by its inhabitants, assisted by the Ostrogothic general Theudis. The Ostrogoths overrun Provence (Southern Gaul), and consolidate their gains in the region.
 Theodoric the Great appoints his friend Anicius Manlius Severinus Boethius, Roman philosopher, to the rank of consul of the Ostrogothic Kingdom. 

 Persian Empire 
 The Sasanian Persians conquer the independent kingdom of Caucasian Albania, a state converted to Christianity in the 4th century by Armenian missionaries (approximate date).

Births 
 Aredius, abbot and saint (approximate date)
 Gildas, Celtic monk (approximate date)
 Xiao Ming Di, emperor of Northern Wei (d. 528)
 Xiao Wu Di, emperor of Northern Wei (d. 535)
 Yifu, empress of Western Wei (d. 540)

Deaths 
 January 1 – Eugendus, abbot of Condat Abbey 
 Drest II, king of the Picts (approximate date)
 Hashim, great-grandfather of Muhammad (approximate date)
 Tato, king of the Lombards (approximate date)

References